Glyphyalinia is a genus of air-breathing land snails, terrestrial pulmonate gastropod mollusks in the family Zonitidae

Species
Species within the genus Glyphyalinia include:
Glyphyalinia indentata (Say, 1823)
Glyphyalinia pecki
 Glyphyalinia umbilicata (Henderson & Daniels, 1917) - Texas glyph

References 

 Nomenclator Zoologicus info

 
Gastropod genera
Taxonomy articles created by Polbot